Deep Water, also known historically as Deepwater, is a census-designated place on the Kanawha River in Fayette County, West Virginia, United States. As of the 2010 census, its population was 280. It is best known as the starting point of the Deepwater Railway founded in 1898 by William N. Page, which was merged to create the Virginian Railway in 1907.

Located near the head of navigation of the Kanawha River just a short distance downstream from Kanawha Falls, it may have been named for that reason. However, according to local legend, as recounted by H. Reid in The Virginian Railway (Kalmbach, 1961), it was named by Squire James Galsepy Kincaid and other locals on a rainy day in 1871 as a commentary on the standing groundwater outside the new post office along Loup Creek.

References

Census-designated places in West Virginia
Census-designated places in Fayette County, West Virginia
Populated places on the Kanawha River